Two human polls and one formulaic ranking make up the 1998 NCAA Division I-A football rankings. Unlike most sports, college football's governing body, the National Collegiate Athletic Association (NCAA), does not bestow a National Championship title for Division I-A football. That title is primarily bestowed by different polling agencies. There are several polls that currently exist. The main weekly polls are the AP Poll and Coaches Poll. The Bowl Championship Series (BCS) standings made their debut in 1998, and began being released about halfway through the season.

Legend

AP Poll

Coaches poll

BCS standings
The Bowl Championship Series (BCS) determined the two teams that competed in the BCS National Championship Game, the 1999 Fiesta Bowl.

Each week, the BCS standings ranked the top 15 teams, or down to the lowest-ranked Automatic Qualifying conference leader.

Source:

References

NCAA Division I FBS football rankings
Bowl Championship Series